Daniel Jay Cameron (born November 22, 1985) is an American lawyer and politician serving as the 51st Attorney General of Kentucky. He is the first African-American, and the first Republican since 1943, to be elected to the office.

Born in Plano, Texas, Cameron moved to Elizabethtown, Kentucky as a child. He attended the University of Louisville. Cameron worked as a law clerk for U.S. District Judge Gregory F. Van Tatenhove for two years, and was then legal counsel to Senate Majority Leader Mitch McConnell from 2015-17. In 2020, he was on President Donald Trump's 20-person shortlist of potential Supreme Court nominees.

Cameron ran in the 2019 Kentucky Attorney General election, receiving Trump's endorsement after the primary. He won with 57.7% of the vote. As attorney general, Cameron unsuccessfully challenged several of Governor Andy Beshear's COVID-19 restrictions. Following the police killing of Breonna Taylor in her home, Cameron announced the decision of his office as special prosecutor to not charge the two police officers who had shot and killed her, leading to widespread protests.

In May 2022, Cameron announced his candidacy in the 2023 Kentucky gubernatorial election.

Early life and education
Cameron was born in Plano, Texas. He later lived in Alabama. He was raised in Elizabethtown, Kentucky. His mother was a professor at Elizabethtown Community and Technical College, and his father owned a local coffee shop. Cameron attended John Hardin High School in neighboring Radcliff.

Cameron was awarded a Senator Mitch McConnell scholarship to attend the University of Louisville, at which point he met McConnell for the first time. He was a defensive back on the 2006 Louisville Cardinals football team, and came off the bench to play in the first two games of the season. He graduated from the university with a BS in 2008, and then graduated in 2011 with a JD from the university's Brandeis School of Law where he was president of the Student Bar Association.

Early career
Cameron was a law clerk for Judge Gregory F. Van Tatenhove of the U.S. District Court for the Eastern District of Kentucky for two years, from 2011-13. From 2013-15, for 18 months he worked for the law firm Stites & Harbison. 

From 2015-17, Cameron served as legal counsel to Senate Majority Leader Mitch McConnell, for whom Tatenhove himself had previously worked. He was responsible for making sure that the office complied with Senate ethics rules, and helped shepherd the confirmations of conservative federal judges including Neil Gorsuch.

In 2017, Cameron returned to Louisville and joined the law firm Frost Brown Todd as a senior associate, in government affairs.

Attorney General of Kentucky

Campaign

Cameron ran for Attorney General of Kentucky in 2019, and defeated State Senator Wil Schroder in the Republican primary by a margin of 132,400 (55.3%) votes to 106,950 (44.7%) votes. After the primary, he was endorsed by President Donald Trump. In the November 2019 general election, Cameron defeated the Democratic nominee, former Attorney General Greg Stumbo, with 57.8% of the vote.

He was the first Republican elected to be attorney general of Kentucky since Eldon S. Dummit, who served from 1944 to 1948. He is also the state's first African-American attorney general. Following Republican former Lieutenant Governor Jenean Hampton, Cameron became Kentucky's second African-American statewide officer, and the first to be independently elected (given that Hampton had shared the 2015 gubernatorial ticket with Matt Bevin).

Tenure as Attorney General
Cameron's term as attorney general was scheduled to begin on January 6, 2020. However, on December 17, 2019, newly elected Kentucky Governor Andy Beshear signed an executive order appointing Cameron to the office, filling the vacancy created when Beshear resigned after winning election to the governorship. Immediately after the order was signed, Cameron was officially sworn into office by US District Judge Gregory F. Van Tatenhove, whom Cameron had clerked for after graduating from law school.

Abortions
On March 27, 2020, Cameron called for halting abortions in Kentucky during the coronavirus pandemic, arguing it was an elective medical procedure that should fall under the statewide ban for the duration of the pandemic. During the closing days of the legislative session, the Kentucky legislature voted to give the attorney general power to regulate abortion clinics, but the legislation was vetoed by Governor Beshear.

Pandemic
Cameron initiated unsuccessful legal challenges to executive actions that Governor Beshear took to combat the spread of COVID-19. In a court filing in July 2020, Cameron asked a state judge to invalidate all of Beshear's COVID-19 orders, and to bar the governor from issuing or enforcing any further COVID-19 order. Cameron described his request as an attempt "to protect the rights of Kentuckians"; Beshear condemned Cameron's motion as "scary and reckless," and said it would endanger public health, lead to more deaths, and harm the economy. The governor noted that Cameron's filing called for the invalidation of executive action that required face masks in public places, imposed restrictions on public gatherings, expanded workers' compensation eligibility for workers who were under quarantine due to exposure to the virus, and the waiver of copays, deductibles, and other costs associated with COVID-19-related healthcare. In an interim order in July 2020, the Kentucky Supreme Court blocked efforts by Cameron and lower courts to nullify the executive orders, pending the state Supreme Court's own review. In November 2020, the Kentucky Supreme Court unanimously upheld the constitutionality of Beshear's emergency coronavirus executive orders.

In December 2020, after initially Judge Gregory F. Van Tatenhove of the Federal District Court in Frankfort, Kentucky, whom Cameron had clerked for, for two years, found in favor of Cameron in his lawsuit challenging an order from Beshear that temporarily closed all elementary, middle, and high schools in an effort to combat the pandemic, the US Supreme Court overturned the trial court's opinion and held against Cameron.

Banks
In November 2022, the Kentucky Bankers Association of 150 banks doing business in Kentucky sued Cameron in Franklin Circuit Court; Cameron had the case removed to the US District Court for the Eastern District of Kentucky before  Judge Gregory Van Tatenhove, for whom Cameron was previously a law clerk. It said Cameron has displayed "amazing and disturbing broad overreach" by overstepping his legal authority, and did not have authority to demand detailed information from banks as part of an investigation into their environmental lending practices, which it said was a big government intrusion on private businesses that could create "an ongoing state surveillance system."  Ballard Cassady, CEO of the association, said: "Kentucky banks must be allowed to make good business decisions for their bank, their customers and community without worrying about how they relate to broader ideological or political goals."

Breonna Taylor case 

The police killing of unarmed 26-year-old emergency room technician Breonna Taylor in her home, as plainclothes police broke into her home without warning and fired 32 shots in her apartment at 1 AM on March 13, 2020, led to over 100 days of loud impatience across the United States. Cameron could have appointed a special prosecutor, but instead opted to have his office act as special prosecutor in the case, because of the "importance of this matter...." Over six months after Taylor was killed, Cameron announced the decision of his office as special prosecutor, following the conclusion of a state grand jury investigation into Taylor's shooting.

Cameron's office decided not to charge the two police officers who had shot Taylor six times and killed her. Separately, a third officer—who had not shot Taylor—was charged with wanton endangerment, but for accidentally endangering the lives of three of Taylor’s neighbors by shooting into an adjacent apartment. Cameron's announcement led to widespread grief, fury, protests, chanting crowds marching in cities across the United States, and the shooting of two police officers in Louisville.

On July 14, 2020, over 100 protestors organized by the social justice organization Until Freedom marched to Cameron's house, and organized a sit-in on his front lawn, demanding that charges be brought against the officers who had shot and killed Taylor. Until Freedom co-founder Linda Sarsour said: "We are here to hold Daniel Cameron accountable and make sure that he does his job, because he is not doing his job."

Police officers arrested 87 protestors, including Houston Texans wide receiver Kenny Stills and Porsha Williams (a member of the cast of The Real Housewives of Atlanta), and charged them each with several crimes including Intimidating a Participant in the Legal Process, a Class D felony. Cameron accused the protestors of trespassing on his private property and claimed the protest's purpose was to "escalate" tension and division in the community.  Singer Beyoncé and Louisville native actress Jennifer Lawrence called on Cameron to prosecute the officers who killed Taylor, and a cousin of the Muhammad Ali blasted him at a rally, and urged him not to be "on the wrong side of history."

On September 23, 2020, Cameron announced that former officer Brett Hankison was being indicted on three counts of wanton endangerment. But he wasn't being indicted for killing Taylor, but rather for firing his weapon into the home of a family living next door to Taylor's apartment.

At the same time, however, Cameron's office decided not to charge officers Jonathan Mattingly and Myles Cosgrove, who had shot Taylor six times and killed her, with any crimes, as Cameron decided that they had not engaged in any wrongdoing.  Cameron said that their firing their weapons into Taylor's apartment was a justified use of force.

At a news conference announcing the wanton endangerment charges against Hankison, Cameron appeared to choke up, and said "My heart breaks for the loss of Miss Taylor."
 Cameron initially stated at the news conference that he had walked the grand jury through "every homicide offense, and also presented all of the information that was available," and that it was the jury that "made the determination” to not bring charges against the officers who had killed Taylor. The Louisville Courier Journal raised questions, however, about whether the grand jury was allowed to decide if charges should have been pressed against Mattingly and Cosgrove—or whether, instead, prosecutors had decided themselves that the officers had acted in self-defense, and not submitted the issue to the grand jury. Attorneys for Hankison and Walker requested the release of the grand jury transcript and related evidence.

Aftermath
On September 28, 2020, a grand juror filed a court motion stating that Cameron had mischaracterized the grand-jury proceedings, and was "using grand jurors as a shield to deflect accountability and responsibility" for charging decisions. Grand jurors said that Cameron only presented the grand jury with possible charges for Hankison, but not for the other two officers who had shot and killed Taylor. A judge ordered the release of the grand jury proceedings' recording. A day later, Cameron said that he had not recommended murder charges to the grand jury, but maintained that he presented "a thorough and complete case" to the grand jurors. Cameron then filed objections with the court, seeking to forbid the grand jurors from speaking publicly about what instructions they had received from his office, but Judge Annie O’Connell of Jefferson County Circuit Court refused to countenance his objections, writing that they "read as theatrical Sturm und Drang.”

In January 2021, three grand jurors filed a petition with the Kentucky House of Representatives, asking that Cameron be impeached, saying he mishandled the case. They also said that Cameron lied and fed misinformation to the media in an effort to make himself look desirable, and to avoid accountability.  They said that while Cameron stated to the public that homicide charges against the officers were a possibility, that was not at all true, as the only charge that was presented to the grand jury was a wanton endangerment charge against an officer for firing his weapon into a nearby apartment. They also demanded that Cameron be disqualified from holding office in Kentucky in the future.

Due to the unresolved questions that had arisen and focused national attention on the case, in August 2022 the United States Department of Justice intervened after two years and filed charges against four of the officers involved in the killing of Taylor. They were ex-Detectives Hankison and Joshua Jaynes, plus Detective Kelly Goodlett and Sergeant Kyle Meany. The US Department of Justice contended that officers conspired to file untrue statements, had made false statements to obtain a search warrant to search the victim's home, and engaged in a cover-up after her death.

The president and CEO of the Louisville Urban League said: "How can it be that the federal government and state government are so far apart on this case?" She demanded an investigation into Cameron’s prosecution of the case — which she said was either “incompetent” or “in collusion” with the police.

In September 2022, the Louisville branch of the NAACP asked Cameron to resign, saying he failed to conduct a fair investigation into Breonna Taylor's shooting death, and was unfit to remain in office. The NAACP also asked the Kentucky General Assembly to remove him if he did not agree to step down on his own. The NAACP added: "The recent federal indictments of four Louisville Metro Police officers involved in the Breonna Taylor killing has highlighted, demonstrated, and proven the insufficiency of the state investigation led by the Attorney General of the Commonwealth and an absence of an understanding of the Commonwealth’s criminal laws."

National politics
After his election as Kentucky attorney general, Cameron was seen by some analysts as a rising star in the Republican Party. He spoke at the 2020 Republican National Convention on August 24, 2020. In September 2020, Cameron appeared on a 20-person shortlist of potential U.S. Supreme Court nominees by President Donald Trump.

2023 gubernatorial campaign

Cameron announced his candidacy for governor on May 11, 2022. He criticized Beshear's emergency orders during the COVID-19 pandemic, and emphasized his opposition to abortion. Former president Trump endorsed Cameron's gubernatorial bid. He is running against, among others, former U.S. Ambassador to the United Nations Kelly Craft and state Agriculture Commissioner Ryan Quarles.

Personal life
Cameron has been married twice. His first marriage, to Elizabeth Cameron, lasted from 2016 to 2017, when they divorced. He married a second time on July 31, 2020 to Makenze Evans, a 27-year-old schoolteacher. Essence, a magazine for African-American women, and Reuters reported that Cameron faced criticism on social media for hosting an engagement party in June 2020 during the time of the long unfinished investigation into Breonna Taylor's death without any charges being filed.

Cameron married Evans in August 2020, and their son was born on January 5, 2022.

Footnotes

References

External links
 Kentucky Attorney General Daniel Cameron official state government site
 
 

 

1985 births
21st-century American lawyers
21st-century American politicians
21st-century African-American politicians
20th-century African-American people
African-American lawyers
African-American people in Kentucky politics
African-American history in Louisville, Kentucky
American football defensive backs
Black conservatism in the United States
Black Lives Matter
John Hardin High School alumni
Kentucky Attorneys General
Kentucky Republicans
Lawyers from Louisville, Kentucky
Living people
Louisville Cardinals football players
People from Elizabethtown, Kentucky
Politicians from Louisville, Kentucky
United States congressional aides
University of Louisville School of Law alumni